Attagenus schaefferi is a species of carpet beetle in the family Dermestidae. It is found in North America.

Subspecies
These two subspecies belong to the species Attagenus schaefferi:
 Attagenus schaefferi hypar Beal, 1970 i c g
 Attagenus schaefferi spurcus LeConte, 1874 i c g
Data sources: i = ITIS, c = Catalogue of Life, g = GBIF, b = Bugguide.net

References

Further reading

 
 

Dermestidae
Articles created by Qbugbot
Beetles described in 1792